Myticin is a cysteine-rich peptide produced in three isoforms, A, B and C, by Mytilus galloprovincialis (Mediterranean mussel). Isoforms A and B show antibacterial activity against Gram-positive bacteria, while isoform C is additionally active against the fungus Fusarium oxysporum and bacterium Escherichia coli (streptomycin resistant strain D31). Myticin-prepro is the precursor peptide.

The mature molecule, named myticin, consists of 40 residues, with four intramolecular disulphide bridges and a cysteine array in the primary structure different from that of previously characterised cysteine-rich antimicrobial peptides. The first 20 amino acids are a putative signal peptide, and the antimicrobial peptide sequence is a 36-residue C-terminal extension. Such a structure suggests that myticins are synthesised as prepro-proteins that are then processed by various proteolytic events before storage in the haemocytes as the active peptide. Myticin precursors are expressed mainly in the haemocytes.

References

Antimicrobial peptides
Protein families